Aleksandra Opachanova (born 7 March 1989) is a Kazakh rower. She competed in the women's lightweight double skulls at the 2008 Summer Olympics. She also won a Bronze medal at the 2018 Asian Games, competing in the women's single sculls.

References

External links
 
 

Living people
Kazakhstani female rowers
Olympic rowers of Kazakhstan
Rowers at the 2008 Summer Olympics
Rowers at the 2006 Asian Games
Rowers at the 2010 Asian Games
Rowers at the 2018 Asian Games
Medalists at the 2018 Asian Games
Asian Games medalists in rowing
Asian Games bronze medalists for Kazakhstan
1989 births
20th-century Kazakhstani women
21st-century Kazakhstani women